Irnfried Freiherr von Wechmar (12 February 1899 – 27 November 1959) was a highly decorated Oberst in the Wehrmacht during World War II and an Oberst der Reserve in the Bundeswehr. He was also a recipient of the Knight's Cross of the Iron Cross. The Knight's Cross of the Iron Cross was awarded to recognise extreme battlefield bravery or successful military leadership.

Awards and decorations
 Iron Cross (1914)
 2nd Class
 1st Class
 Honour Cross of the World War 1914/1918
 Iron Cross (1939)
 2nd Class
 1st Class
 German Cross in Gold (16 January 1942)
 Knight's Cross of the Iron Cross on 13 April 1941 as Oberstleutnant and commander of Aufklärungs-Abteilung 3
 Knight of Honor of the Order of Saint John
 Italian silver medal "Al valore militare" (1942)

Footnotes

References

Citations

Bibliography

External links
Ritterkreuztraeger 1939-1945
Lexikon der Wehrmacht
TracesOfWar.com

1899 births
1959 deaths
German Army personnel of World War I
Recipients of the clasp to the Iron Cross, 1st class
Recipients of the Gold German Cross
Recipients of the Knight's Cross of the Iron Cross
Military personnel from Frankfurt
German prisoners of war in World War II held by the United Kingdom
German Army officers of World War II
Barons of Germany
People from Hesse-Nassau